Tommy Núñéz is the founder of the Tommy Núñez foundation and a former NBA referee. He is the father of former NBA referee Tommy Núñez Jr. He was born on September 10, 1938 in Santa Maria, California and is of Mexican American descent. In 1972 he was hired by the NBA and became the first Hispanic to referee in any major sport. After 30 years of reffing in the NBA, Tommy retired in 2002. Since retiring he puts all his time and energy into speaking to kids from coast to coast, organizing summer sports camps, youth programs or directing his National Hispanic Basketball tournament.

External links
Tommy Núñez Foundation (Official Site)

National Basketball Association referees
Living people
1938 births
Sportspeople from Santa Maria, California
American sportspeople of Mexican descent